Greatest Hits is the first greatest hits album by Australian singer Kylie Minogue. The album was released on 24 August 1992 as Minogue's final release under Pete Waterman Limited (PWL). The record contains nineteen singles from the singer's first four studio albums, as well as three new songs recorded specifically for inclusion on this album. The album was largely written and produced by the Stock Aitken Waterman team, and its release marked the end of Minogue's professional relationship with them. It contained all her single releases to date including the Japan-only single, "Turn It into Love", featured on Kylie's first studio album in 1988.

Greatest Hits entered the UK Albums Chart at number one, becoming Minogue's third number-one album in the United Kingdom. It charted there for eleven weeks and was later certified platinum for shipments of 300,000 copies. The album was also successful in Australia, debuting and peaking at number three and charting for fifteen weeks. It was later certified platinum for shipments exceeding 70,000 copies, by Australian Recording Industry Association.
 
This compilation was superseded by 2004's Ultimate Kylie collection, with only seven tracks not being included on that 2-CD set and, later, by 2019's Step Back in Time: The Definitive Collection, with only three tracks not being included on the expanded, 3-CD version of the latter. Following her release from PWL, she stated that she felt stifled by Stock, Aitken and Waterman, saying, "I was very much a puppet in the beginning. I was blinkered by my record company. I was unable to look left or right."

Release
The album was promoted with two singles, "What Kind of Fool (Heard All That Before)" and "Celebration", originally a hit for Kool & The Gang in 1980. In Australia, the album was released with completely different artwork and was available as a limited edition digi-pack. A limited edition was also available in Australia with the Kylie's Non-Stop History 50+1 remix album as a bonus disc and the original album was later re-issued again with the original UK artwork in 1998. An accompanying video compilation called Greatest Video Hits was released alongside the album. The video featured all Minogue's music videos to date except the in-house promo video for "Made in Heaven". The Australian version keeps the original title, Greatest Hits, and was released with the same cover as the Australian edition of its audio counterpart. The Japanese Laserdisc edition also includes the video for "Celebration".

In the 2009 iTunes re-release, the single versions of the tracks have been put in place of the album versions, including a rare single version of "It's No Secret" put in place of the original album version. The album was re-issued again in 2011 with an altered track list for the South African leg of Kylie's Aphrodite World Tour.

Singles

The first single was "What Kind of Fool (Heard All That Before)". It was released in the United Kingdom in August 1992 and peaked at number fourteen in the UK Singles Chart. The release was backed with the fan-favourite "Things Can Only Get Better".

The second and final single was "Celebration", a cover of Kool & the Gang's hit. It was released in November 1992 and peaked at number twenty on the UK Singles Chart. It was also Minogue's last single for PWL.

Reception
The album is Minogue's third number one album in the United Kingdom, after Kylie (1988) and Enjoy Yourself (1989).

Track listing
All songs written and produced by Mike Stock, Matt Aitken and Pete Waterman except where noted.

Charts

Certifications and sales

Release history

References

External links
 Greatest Hits at Kylie.com (archived from 2007)
 

1992 greatest hits albums
1992 video albums
2002 remix albums
Albums produced by Stock Aitken Waterman
Kylie Minogue compilation albums
Kylie Minogue remix albums
Music video compilation albums